WOVI (89.5 MHz) is a full-service high school radio station in Novi, Michigan. One of its slogans is "Real Radio."

The station broadcasts from Novi High School with 100 watts. It offers a variety of music hosted by students who are considering life in the radio market after high school.

The station was run by David Legg, former head of the broadcasting department at Novi High School.

References
Michiguide.com - WOVI History

External links
WOVI Official Website

OVI
Adult album alternative radio stations in the United States
Radio stations established in 1978
Novi, Michigan
High school radio stations in the United States